Bayram Kandi may refer to:
 Bayram Kandi, Charuymaq, East Azerbaijan Province
 Bayram Kandi, Malekan, East Azerbaijan Province
 Bayram Kandi, Khoy, West Azerbaijan Province
 Bayram Kandi, Showt, West Azerbaijan Province